The women's pentathlon at the 2018 IAAF World Indoor Championships took place on 2 March 2018.

Summary
No podium athletes returned from the previous championships, nor the 2017 World Championships or Olympics.  The top returnee was sixth place Kendell Williams, while Katarina Johnson-Thompson and Yorgelis Rodríguez just missed the medals at the World Championships less than six months earlier.

Williams and her American teammate Erica Bougard dominated the first event, running the 60 meters hurdles in 8.08 and 8.07, respectively.  Johnson-Thompson and Rodríguez came forward in the high jump clearing  and 1.88m respectively.  Johnson-Thompson took a 13 point lead over Bougard.  Antoinette Nana Djimou had the best shot put by more than a metre over any of the leaders, 3 metres over Bougard, Williams and almost as much for Johnson-Thompson.  Rodríguez took over the lead by 13 points over Johnson-Thompson, while Ivona Dadic moved into third just a point behind Johnson-Thompson.  Back to another Johnson-Thompson specialty event, she long jumped  to put 10 cm on Dadic and 35 cm on Rodríguez.  A 2 cm superior jump by Eliška Klučinová was enough to displace Bougard from fourth place, both more than 100 points out of second place, still almost 40 points behind Rodríguez in third.   In the final event, the 800 meters, Johnson-Thompson left no doubt, winning the race outright.  More than a second behind her, Rodríguez did beat Dadic, but only by .12, not nearly enough to make up the 65 point deficit.

Results

60 metres hurdles
The 60 metres hurdles were started at 10:18.

High jump
The high jump was started at 11:54.

Shot put
The shot put was started at 13:29.

Long jump
The long jump was started at 18:00.

800 metres

The 800 metres were started at 20:18.

Final standings
After all events.

References

Pentathlon
Combined events at the World Athletics Indoor Championships